Raj Kanwar (28 June 1961 – 3 February 2012) was an Indian film director, writer and film producer of Hindi films based in Mumbai, India.

Family and personal life
He was educated in Col. Brown Cambridge School in Dehradun.

He has two sons (with his wife Anita Kanwar), Karan Raj Kanwar and Abhay Kanwar, both of whom have worked as film directors and producers. Filmmaker K. Pappu is his elder brother.

On 3 February 2012, he died due to a kidney ailment in Singapore.

Career
Kanwar began his career directing plays in Delhi. He then moved to Mumbai where he worked as an assistant to directors like Shekhar Kapur and Raj Kumar Santoshi. His directorial debut was Deewana. Released in 1992, the film was a box office Blockbuster and marked the screen debut of Shahrukh Khan. He directed several other box office hits like Laadla (1994), Jaan (1996), Jeet (1996), Judaai (1997), Daag: The Fire (1999) and Badal (2000). Kanwar went on to discover actors like Lara Dutta and Priyanka Chopra whom he cast in his film Andaaz in 2003. His last film was Sadiyaan (2010).  Anurag Singh was an Chief Assistant with him for most of films. Most of his films lead characters are named Karan and Kajal.

Filmography

Director
 Sadiyaan (2010)
 Humko Deewana Kar Gaye (2006)
 Andaaz (2003)
 Ab Ke Baras (2002)
 Farz (2001)
 Dhaai Akshar Prem Ke (2000)
 Har Dil Jo Pyar Karega (2000)
 Badal (2000)
 Daag: The Fire (1999)
 Itihaas (1997)
 Judaai (1997)
 Jeet (1996)
 Jaan (1996)
 Kartavya (1995)
 Laadla (1994)
 Deewana (1992)

Writer
 Humko Deewana Kar Gaye (2006)
 Andaaz (2003) (story)
 Dhaai Akshar Prem Ke (2000)
 Badal (2000) (story)
 Daag: The Fire (1999)
 Itihaas (1997) (story)
 Jeet (1996)

Producer
 Sadiyaan (2010)
 Raqeeb (2007)
 Humko Deewana Kar Gaye (2006)
 Ab Ke Baras (2002)
 Dhaai Akshar Prem Ke (2000)
 Daag: The Fire (1999)
 Itihaas (1997)

Assistant director
 Ghayal (1990)
 Ram-Avtar (1988).
 Mr. India (1987)

References

External links
 

Hindi-language film directors
Indian male screenwriters
Hindi film producers
2012 deaths
Deaths from kidney disease
Year of birth uncertain
20th-century Indian film directors
21st-century Indian film directors
Film directors from Mumbai
Film producers from Mumbai
Hindi screenwriters
20th-century Indian dramatists and playwrights
21st-century Indian dramatists and playwrights
Screenwriters from Mumbai
20th-century Indian male writers
1961 births